Hilmar is an Germanic and Nordic given name, meaning famous/notorious fighter/noble/protector.

Hilmar may refer to:

Places
Hilmar, California
Hilmar Cheese Company, cheese and whey products manufacturer headquartered in Hilmar, California
Hilmar-Irwin, census-designated place (CDP) in Merced County, California, United States

People

Given name
Hilmar Baunsgaard (1920–1989), Danish politician
Hilmar Björnsson (born 1969), Icelandic football (soccer) player 
Hilmar Duerbeck (1948–2012), German astronomer
Hilmar Örn Hilmarsson (born 1958), musician and art director 
Hilmar Hoffmann (1925–2018), German cultural worker and functionary
Hilmar Kabas (born 1942), Austrian politician
Hilmar Meincke Krohg (1776–1851), Norwegian politician
Hilmar Kopper (1935–2021), German banker and former Chairman of the Board of Deutsche Bank
Hilmar Moore (1920–2012), American rancher and the mayor of Richmond, Texas
Hilmar Myhra (1915–2013), Norwegian ski jumper
Hilmar Reksten (1897–1980), Norwegian shipping magnate
Hilmar Martinus Strøm (1817–?), Norwegian politician
Hilmar Thate (1931–2016), German actor
Hilmar Wäckerle (1899–1941), German soldier in the German Imperial Army and the Waffen-SS a
Hilmar Weilandt (born 1966), German football player
Hilmar Wictorin (1894–1964), Swedish water polo player and Olympian
Hilmar Zahn (1919–2008), highly decorated paratrooper and captain in the Nazi German army

Middle name
Geir Hilmar Haarde (born 1951), Icelandic politician and former Prime Minister
Jobst-Hilmar von Bose (1897–1949), decorated military in the German Empire and in nazi Germany 
Paul Hilmar Jensen (1930–2004), Norwegian philatelist

Family name
Ernst Hilmar (1938–2016), Austrian librarian, editor, and musicologist
Gustav Hilmar (1891–1967), Czechoslovak film actor